Municipal elections in Lima were held on 7 October 2018. 82.56% of eligible voters cast ballots in the election.
The mayoral election produced the following results:
Jorge Muñoz Wells—1,907,693
Daniel Urresti—1,042,481
Renzo Reggiardo—469,533
Alberto Beingolea—236,320
Ricardo Belmont—205,716
Juan Carlos Zurek—190,194
Jaime Salinas—186,348
Diethell Columbus—142,913
Luis Castaneda Pardo---136,657

The distribution of seats among parties which ensured representation in the city council is as follows:
Popular Action—21
Podemos Perú—8
PPS—3
PPC—2
Peru Libertario—1
Somos Peru—1
Alliance for Progress—1
Popular Force—1
PSN—1

References

Lima
Municipal elections in Peru
2018 elections in South America
2018 in Peru